The name Communist Party of Sweden (abbreviated SKP) has been used by several political parties in Sweden:

 Left Party (Sweden), known as the Communist Party of Sweden from 1921 to 1967
 Communist Party of Sweden (1924), split off by SKP leader Zeth Höglund in 1924 (which later merged with the Social Democrats in 1926)
 Socialist Party (Sweden, 1929), the majority of 99 SKP main branch, expelled from the Communist International in 1929, dissolved in 1948
 Communist Party of Sweden (1967) (KFML), a Maoist party called the Communist Party of Sweden between 1973 and 1987
 Communist Party (Sweden), an active anti-revisionist party
 Communist Workers' Party of Sweden (SKA), an anti-Deng Xiaoping party formed in 1980 but dissolved in 1993
 Communist Party in Sweden (KPS), a pro-Albanian dissenter group formed in 1982 but dissolved in 1993
 Communist Party of Sweden (1995), the group previously known as the Workers' Party – the Communists (APK)